Per Erik Hedman (born 1959 in Bjurholm in Sweden) is a Disney comics writer. He moved to Denmark in 1982.

External links

1959 births
Living people
People from Bjurholm Municipality
Swedish emigrants to Denmark
Date of birth missing (living people)